Saint-Simon (Auvergnat: Sant Simon) is a commune in the Cantal department in south-central France.

The medieval town of Belliac, located near the present-day Saint-Simon, was the birthplace (in 946) of the prolific scholar Gerbert d'Aurillac, who became Pope Sylvester II, the first of the French popes.

Population

See also
Communes of the Cantal department

References

Communes of Cantal
Cantal communes articles needing translation from French Wikipedia